Suresh Parshottamdas Dalal, (11 October 1932 – 10 August 2012) was a Gujarati poet, essayist, litterateur and editor.

Life
Dalal was born on 11 October 1932 in Thane to Purushottamdas and Bhanumati. He completed B.A. in Gujarati in 1953 from Saint Xavier's College; M.A. in 1955 and PhD in 1969 from University of Mumbai. He taught at K. C. Arts College, Mumbai from 1956 to 1964. He also served as professor of Gujarati at Kirti College from 1958 to 1960 and at H.R. College of Commerce and Economics from 1960 to 1964. He joined K. J. Somaiya College in 1964 and headed the Gujarati Department. He later served as the Head of the Gujarati Department at SNDT Women's University; Vice-chancellor at Maharaja Sayajirao University of Baroda; and a "National Lecturer" for the UGC. He has also been a member of the advisory board of Gujarati Sahitya Academy from 1983 to 1987. He was also the editor of the Gujarati poetry journal Kavita and literary quarterly Vivechana.

He died on 10 August 2012 at Mumbai following a heart attack.

Works

Poetry
His poetry collections include sonnets, long and prose-poems too. His poetry collections are Ekant (1966), Tarikh nu Ghar (1971), Astitva (1973), Naam Lakhi Dau (1975), Hastakshar (1977), Symphony (1977), Skyscraper (1980), Ek Anami Nadi (1982), Ghatana (1984), Bhura Akashni Asha.

Awards
He received Sahitya Akademi Award for Gujarati writers in 2005 for his poetry Akhand Zalar Vage. He has been awarded with several other awards including the Gujarat Government Award 5 times. His Prose Poem has been translated into English by the Poetry Translation Centre.

See also
List of Gujarati-language writers
List of Sahitya Akademi Award winners for Gujarati

References

External links
 
 

1932 births
2012 deaths
Recipients of the Sahitya Akademi Award in Gujarati
Recipients of the Ranjitram Suvarna Chandrak
Recipients of the Sahitya Akademi Prize for Translation